The Salt Lake Hardware Building is a converted warehouse building, located at 155 N 400 West in Salt Lake City, Utah. In 1996, with the help of FFKR Architects, it was converted to office space for Albertsons operations, but currently it is used for commercial office space. The design was special in that it allowed the building to maintain the historic aspects. In 2001, the building was listed on the National Register of Historic Places. At that time there was a water tower on the roof; the tower has since been renovated and renewed. The building was built in 1909, just north of a depot of the Oregon Short Line Railroad.

References

External links
 http://www.utahlocations.com/salt-lake-hardware-building/?rq=Salt%20lake%20hardware%20building Utah Locations: Salt Lake Hardware Building]
 http://www.ffkr.com/gallery/salt-lake-hardware-building/

Buildings and structures in Salt Lake City
Office buildings in Salt Lake City
Industrial buildings and structures in Utah
1909 establishments in Utah